The 2020–21 Colonial Athletic Association football season was the fourteenth season of football for the Colonial Athletic Association (CAA) and part of the 2020–21 NCAA Division I FCS football season. The entirety of the season was completed in the spring due to the COVID-19 pandemic in the United States, and Towson opted to not participate in the season. Albany opted out on March 31 after playing 4 games, with New Hampshire following on April 6 and Rhode Island opting out the next day.

Previous season

James Madison won the CAA championship outright with a conference record of 8–0. They were joined in the FCS playoffs by Albany and Villanova.

In the playoffs, Albany defeated Central Connecticut in the first round before falling to Montana State. Villanova fell to Southeastern Louisiana in the first round. James Madison had a first round bye before defeating Monmouth, Northern Iowa, and Weber State on route to the National Championship game, where they fell to North Dakota State.

Head coaches

Regular season

All times Eastern time.

Weeks labeled by the associated Saturday.

Rankings reflect that of the STATS FCS poll for that week.

February 20

February 27

March 6

Players of the week:

March 13

Players of the week:

March 20

Players of the week:

March 27

Players of the week:

April 3

Players of the week:

April 10

Players of the week:

April 17

Players of the week:

FCS playoffs

References